Joe Bernstein is the name of:
*Joe Bernstein (boxer) (1877–1931), one of the first great boxers to emerge from New York's Lower East Side
Joe Bernstein (American football) (1893–1967), professional football player
Joe Bernstein (poker player) (1899–1975), poker player and road gambler